Rickey Deshun Dudley (born July 15, 1972), is a former professional American football player. A 6'6", 252-lb. tight end from Ohio State University, Dudley was selected by the Oakland Raiders in the 1st round (9th overall) of the 1996 NFL Draft. He played in nine seasons in the National Football League (NFL) from 1996 to 2004 for the Raiders, the Cleveland Browns, and the Tampa Bay Buccaneers, where he won Super Bowl XXXVII. A thumb injury that required surgery ended his career after the 2004 season.

References

External links
 

1972 births
Living people
American football tight ends
Cleveland Browns players
Oakland Raiders players
Ohio State Buckeyes football players
Tampa Bay Buccaneers players
People from Henderson, Texas
Players of American football from Texas
African-American players of American football
21st-century African-American sportspeople
20th-century African-American sportspeople